The New England Liberty was a women's American football team that played in the Legends Football League for the 2016 season. They played their games at the Verizon Wireless Arena in Manchester, New Hampshire.

Their inaugural season got off to a rocky start with a bench clearing brawl after an opening game loss to the Omaha Heart. After losing their first three games, they were forced to forfeit their final game against Atlanta Steam due to being unable to field a full team because of injuries. The team did not return for the 2017 season and was replaced by the Pittsburgh Rebellion.

References

American football teams in New Hampshire
Legends Football League US teams
Sports in Manchester, New Hampshire
American football teams established in 2016
American football teams disestablished in 2016
2016 establishments in New Hampshire
2016 disestablishments in New Hampshire
Women's sports in New Hampshire